Lucien Callamand born Lucien Marie Pascal Eugène Callamand (April 1, 1888, in Marseille – December 3, 1968, in Nice, Alpes-Maritimes) was one of the earliest French film actors whose career spanned six decades of French cinema. Between 1909 and 1965, he starred in at least 115 films.

Selected silent films
Ma femme veut conduire (1914)
Le Roman d'un spahi Le (1914)
Narcisse a perdu son oncle (1913)
Agénor et la main qui vole (1912)
Agénor le bien-aimé (1912)
Ma concierge est trop jolie (1912) (as Paul Lack)
Agénor, cavalier de deuxième classe (1911)
L'Envieuse  (1911)
Le Pain des petits oiseaux (1911)
Un monsieur qui a un tic (1911)
L'Assommoir (1909)
La Jeunesse de Vidocq ou Comment on devient policier (1909)

Selected sound filmography 
 Un trou dans le mur (1930)
 Marius (1931)
 Le capitaine Craddock (1931)
 Ronny (1931)
 Nuits de Venise (1931)
 Les vacances du diable (1931)
 Stupéfiants (1932)
 Vous serez ma femme (1932)
 La belle aventure (1932)
 L'Or dans la rue (1934)
 Le Roi des Champs-Élysées (1934)
 On a volé un homme (1934)
 Divine (1935)
 Counsel for Romance (1936)
 On the Road (1936)
 The Kiss of Fire (1937)
 Barnabé (1938)
 Gargousse (1938)
 The Acrobat (1941)
 The Murderer is Afraid at Night (1942)
 The Mysteries of Paris (1943)
 Two Timid Souls (1943)
 The Marriage of Ramuntcho (1947)
 The Sharks of Gibraltar (1947)
Rumours (1947)
 The Dancer of Marrakesh (1949)
 Millionaires for One Day (1949)
 56 Rue Pigalle (1949)
 The King (1949)
 Dominique (1950)
 The Lady from Boston (1951)
 The Convict (1951)
 Fanfan la Tulipe (1952)
 Dans la vie tout s'arrange (1952)
 Je l'ai été trois fois (1952)
 My Husband Is Marvelous (1952)
 The Lovers of Marianne (1953)
 Napoleon Road (1953)
 L'Étrange Désir de monsieur Bard (1954)
 Stopover in Orly (1955)
 The Case of Doctor Laurent (1957)
 Fugitive in Saigon (1957)
 Toi, le venin (1958)

External links
 

1888 births
1968 deaths
French male film actors
French male silent film actors
Male actors from Marseille
20th-century French male actors